Pōhara is a rural locality in the Tasman District of New Zealand's South Island. The locality is northeast of Tākaka and southwest of Tata Beach. To the north is Limestone Bay, part of Golden Bay / Mohua

The official spelling was changed from "Pohara" to "Pōhara" by the New Zealand Geographic Board Ngā Pou Taunaha o Aotearoa on 5 November 2018.

In the peak holiday season between Christmas and the end of the year, Pōhara beach has up to 700 visitors a day.

Demographics

Pōhara

It had a population of 516 at the 2018 New Zealand census, an increase of 9 people (1.8%) since the 2013 census, and an increase of 12 people (2.4%) since the 2006 census. There were 231 households. There were 240 males and 282 females, giving a sex ratio of 0.85 males per female, with 69 people (13.4%) aged under 15 years, 30 (5.8%) aged 15 to 29, 264 (51.2%) aged 30 to 64, and 150 (29.1%) aged 65 or older.

Ethnicities were 95.9% European/Pākehā, 7.0% Māori, 2.9% Asian, and 1.7% other ethnicities (totals add to more than 100% since people could identify with multiple ethnicities).

Although some people objected to giving their religion, 61.0% had no religion, 25.0% were Christian, 1.2% were Buddhist and 4.1% had other religions.

Of those at least 15 years old, 111 (24.8%) people had a bachelor or higher degree, and 66 (14.8%) people had no formal qualifications. The employment status of those at least 15 was that 159 (35.6%) people were employed full-time, 93 (20.8%) were part-time, and 12 (2.7%) were unemployed.

Pōhara-Abel Tasman statistical area

Pōhara-Abel Tasman had a population of 1,470 at the 2018 New Zealand census, an increase of 27 people (1.9%) since the 2013 census, and an increase of 48 people (3.4%) since the 2006 census. There were 597 households. There were 708 males and 762 females, giving a sex ratio of 0.93 males per female. The median age was 50.4 years (compared with 37.4 years nationally), with 234 people (15.9%) aged under 15 years, 159 (10.8%) aged 15 to 29, 744 (50.6%) aged 30 to 64, and 330 (22.4%) aged 65 or older.

Ethnicities were 94.3% European/Pākehā, 7.1% Māori, 0.8% Pacific peoples, 2.0% Asian, and 2.4% other ethnicities (totals add to more than 100% since people could identify with multiple ethnicities).

The proportion of people born overseas was 22.2%, compared with 27.1% nationally.

Although some people objected to giving their religion, 64.3% had no religion, 21.4% were Christian, 0.6% were Hindu, 1.4% were Buddhist and 3.9% had other religions.

Of those at least 15 years old, 276 (22.3%) people had a bachelor or higher degree, and 186 (15.0%) people had no formal qualifications. The median income was $25,300, compared with $31,800 nationally. The employment status of those at least 15 was that 471 (38.1%) people were employed full-time, 297 (24.0%) were part-time, and 33 (2.7%) were unemployed.

Marae
Onetahua Kōkiri Marae is located in Pōhara. It includes Te Ao Marama wharenui (meeting house) and it is a marae (meeting ground) for Ngāti Rārua, Ngāti Tama ki Te Tau Ihu and Te Atiawa o Te Waka-a-Māui.

References

Populated places in the Tasman District